Lake Minnewaska is a lake in Pope County, in the U.S. state of Minnesota. The cities of Glenwood and Starbuck are located along the lake. It is part of the watershed of the Minnesota River via Outlet Creek, Lake Emily, and an unnamed channel that flows from Lake Emily to the Chippewa River.

Minnewaska is a name derived from the Dakota language meaning "whitecaps".

See also
List of lakes in Minnesota

References

Lakes of Pope County, Minnesota
Lakes of Minnesota